Pasaichthys pleuronectiformis is an extinct, prehistoric moonyfish that lived during the Lutetian epoch of Monte Bolca, Italy.  The average length of its fossils is about 6 centimeters.  In life, it would probably resemble its living relatives of the genus Monodactylus.

See also

 Prehistoric fish
 List of prehistoric bony fish

References

Eocene fish
Monodactylidae
Fossils of Italy
Prehistoric perciform genera